Bornolis is a genus of moths of the family Noctuidae.

Species
 Bornolis kamburonga (Holloway, 1976)

References
 Bornolis  at Markku Savela's Lepidoptera and Some Other Life Forms
 Natural History Museum Lepidoptera genus database

Hadeninae